Clement Twizere Buhake (born 9 July 1996) is a Rwandan footballer who plays as a goalkeeper for Strømmen. He has been capped for the Rwanda national team.

Professional career
Twizere Buhake made his senior debut with Strømmen in a 3–1 Norwegian First Division win over Ullensaker/Kisa IL on 21 November 2020. He became their first-choice goalkeeper in 2022.

International career
Twizere Buhake was called up to the Rwanda national team for a set of friendlies in June 2021. He debuted for Rwanda in a 2–0 friendly win over the Central African Republic on 3 June 2021.

References

External links
 

1996 births
Living people
Rwandan footballers
Rwanda international footballers
Norwegian footballers
Norwegian people of Rwandan descent
Strømmen IF players
Oppsal IF players
Norwegian First Division players
Norwegian Second Division players
Association football goalkeepers